Canyon Bicycles GmbH (abbr.: Canyon) is a German manufacturer of road bikes, mountain bikes, hybrid bikes, triathlon bikes and e-bikes based in Koblenz, Germany.

History 
In 1985 Roman Arnold and his brother Franc Arnold (who is no longer involved with the company) founded 'Radsport Arnold' GmbH as a supplier of bike parts for cycling. It wasn't until 1996 that the first bikes with the brand name Canyon appeared. Radsport Arnold adopted a direct sales strategy via the Internet.

In 2001 the company took the step from being a supplier to becoming a cycle manufacturer and changed its name to Canyon Bicycles GmbH. With Lutz Scheffer (formerly Bergwerk and Votec) Canyon was able to secure the services of a frame designer. In the next few years the firm based in Koblenz, Germany was able to hire Hans Christian Smolik along with other bicycle construction experts.

In 2006 Canyon unveiled its new corporate design, which also received several awards in 2007 (European Design Award for Corporate Design, red dot design awards for Corporate and web design, iF Product Design Award for Corporate Design).

In 2018 Canyon launched its first e-bike called the Spectral:ON.

In 2020 the brand launched the first in its line of CFR bikes (the Strive mountain bike), a limited run of high-end bikes designed for professional riders. The current CFR line up consists of the Aeroad, Exceed, Sender and Ultimate.

Involvement in cycle and triathlon sport 
Radsport Arnold was involved in elite sport right from its start. In 1985 the Koblenz-based company had its first successful sportsman under contract in Jürgen Zäck.

In the area of road racing the company has been in cooperation with various teams. In 2007 the company first equipped the team Unibet.com, which took part in the UCI ProTour. The brand has previously sponsored a number of professional road racing teams including Katusha. Currently, the Movistar men's and women's teams, Arkéa–Samsic, Alpecin–Fenix and Canyon–SRAM compete on Canyon racing bikes.

Nairo Quintana won on a Canyon bike the 2014 Giro d'Italia, riding an Ultimate CF SLX frame for the road stages and a Speedmax CF for the time trials. Then again in 2019 Canyon was at the top of the podium in the Italian Giro with Richard Carapaz reaching the Arena di Verona after a successful last time trial. Other achievements on Canyon bikes include Cadel Evans' 2009 World Professional Road Race Championship for the Silence-Lotto team, Alexander Kristoff's two stage wins in the 2014 Tour de France, Alex Dowsett's Hour Record and Jan Frodeno´s wins at the Ironman European Championship 2015 in Frankfurt and at the Ironman World Championship in Hawaii 2015. From 2017–2020 Canyon run a very successful collaboration with Pauline Ferrand-Prévot who led the athlete to win two French XCO National Championships, racked up multiple XCO World Cup podium finishes, took XCO World Championship bronze, and became national cyclocross champion. After a surgery she was back on the podium in XCO World Cup win in Val di Sole, gold at the XCO World Championships in Mont-Sainte-Anne, and another win at the XCM World Championships in Grächen. Then in 2020 before splitting path with Canyon she won the XCO World Cup race in Nové Město, became XCO World Champion once again, and went on to win European Championship gold.

In December 2016 it was announced that they would co-sponsor the British UCI Continental-status  team, which would make its debut in 2017.

In 2020, Mathieu van der Poel won the Tour of Flanders on a Canyon Aeroad, adding this to a very rich palmares of title in the main XCO competitions and lately road ones, including a sensational win in 2020 Strade Bianche.

Other branding 

Until August 15, 2019, in Switzerland, Canyon bikes were called "Pure Cycling" since the brand name "Canyon" was already registered by Lizard Sport AG. Canyon bikes made for the Swiss market had the brand name on the downtube replaced by the model name.

Controversies 
After standardizing company-wide IT infrastructure to suit projections that began in November 2015, Canyon expanded production facilities to end the year. During the subsequent transitional phases of improvement, Canyon's reputation suffered by reductions in customer service. Associated obstacles were encountered during internal expansions that were coupled to external supply chain deficiencies, regarding spare parts. Reported discontent essentially reflected concerns that the company grew more interested in selling their products than providing adequate customer service.

To address concerns, Canyon's founder and CEO released a service GAU (Größter Anzunehmender Unfall) in February 2016. An official apology was offered within, which addressed customer criticisms. The disclosure also properly informed the public of the contributing circumstances and outlined corrective actions. The firm then thanked customers for their loyalty and continued patience.

References

External links 
 

Cycle manufacturers of Germany
Mountain bike manufacturers
Companies based in Koblenz
Vehicle manufacturing companies established in 1985
1985 establishments in West Germany
German brands
German companies established in 1985